Maxime Landin (born 24 April 1855, date of death unknown) was a French sport shooter who competed in the 1912 Summer Olympics.

He was born in Bagnolet. In 1912 he was a member of the French team which finished fourth in the team 50 metre small-bore rifle and fifth in the team rifle. In the 300 metre military rifle, three positions he finished 70th.

References

1855 births
Year of death missing
French male sport shooters
ISSF rifle shooters
Olympic shooters of France
Shooters at the 1912 Summer Olympics